is a city located in Hiroshima Prefecture, Japan. The name derives from a market traditionally held on the 20th of each month with hatsuka (廿日) meaning "20th day" and ichi (市) translating to "market". The market continues to this day on a small scale featuring fresh, locally grown vegetables and foodstuffs. Following the absorption of the nearby towns of Ōno and Miyajima on November 3, 2005 (as of September 1, 2016), Hatsukaichi has a population of 117,106 and a population density of 239.36 persons per km². The total land area stands at 489.36 km².

History

 The name "Hatsuka-ichi" was from the ichi on the 20th of every month from Kamakura Period.
 "Hatsukaichi-machi", Saeki District, Hiroshima was founded on April 1, 1889.
 The city "Hatsukaichi" was founded on April 1, 1988.
 On March 1, 2003, the town of Saeki and the village of Yoshiwa, both from Saeki District, merged into the expanded city of Hatsukaichi.
 On November 3, 2005, the towns of Miyajima and Ōno (both from Saeki District) were merged into Hatsukaichi. Therefore, Saeki District was dissolved as a result of this merger.

Climate

Education

 The Japanese Red Cross Hiroshima College of Nursing
 Sanyo Women's College

Points of interest

 Itsukushima Shrine - an UNESCO World Heritage Site on the island of Itsukushima (also known as Miyajima) - one of the three most beautiful sites in Japan.
 Marine Plaza Miyajima - an aquarium on Miyajima
 Miyajima Natural Botanical Garden
 Miyao Castle ruins, site of the Battle of Miyajima (1555)
 Miyajima Underwater Firework Festival, held in mid-August
 Hatsukaichi City is considered to be the birthplace of kendama, a traditional Japanese toy.

Transportation
 Hatsukaichi can be accessed from Hiroshima city via the JR West Sanyo Line; on the Hiroden streetcar services' Miyajima Line; as well as by buses and boats.
 JR Miyajima Ferry and Miyajima Matsudai Kisen connect between Miyajimaguchi and Miyajima.

Sister cities
Hatsukaichi has Sister City relationships with:
  Masterton, Greater Wellington, New Zealand
  Mont Saint-Michel, Normandy, France

See also

FM Hatsukaichi

References

External links
 
 Hatsukaichi city official website 
 Le Mont Saint-Michel 
 The 150 year anniversary of France and Japan in 2008  
 

 
Cities in Hiroshima Prefecture